Curious George is a children's book written and illustrated by Margret Rey and H. A. Rey, and published by Houghton Mifflin in 1941. The first book in the Curious George series, it tells the story of an orphaned monkey named George and his adventures with the Man with the Yellow Hat. , it has sold over 25 million copies, and has been translated into various different languages such as Japanese, French, Afrikaans, Portuguese, Swedish, German, Chinese, Danish, and Norwegian. It is also in the Indie Choice Book Awards Picture Book Hall of Fame and has been the subject of scholarly criticism.

Background 
The character of George the monkey originated from the 1939 publication of Cecily G. and the Nine Monkeys, co-written by the Reys and printed in Paris. London-based publisher Grace Hogarth offered a four-book deal to the Reys upon reading their original version of Curious George, and asked the Reys to consider changing the monkey's name from Fifi to Curious George. Curious George was published in America in August 1941, with an initial print run of 7,500 copies and a price of $2.00. However, Margret Rey's name did not appear on early copies of Curious George because the publisher felt that children's literature was too dominated by women.

Plot
The story opens with George, a little orphaned  monkey, in the jungle of Africa. A Man with a Yellow Hat observes him through his binoculars and decides to bring the monkey home with him. He puts his hat on the ground and hides behind a tree. George, ever curious, comes down from the tree. He puts the hat on but it is so large that he cannot see and this gives The Man In The Yellow Hat the chance to capture him and put him in a bag. The man takes George in a rowboat to his cruise ship where he tells George that he is taking him to a zoo in a big city and that he will like it there. He then gives George the run of the ship and tells him not to get into trouble. On deck, George sees some birds, tries to fly, and falls overboard. The crew notices that George is missing, and spot him in the Atlantic Ocean. They throw him a lifesaver and pull him aboard.

When they arrive in America, George says goodbye to the sailors, and is then taken to the man's house, where he has a meal, smokes a pipe, and then goes to bed. The next day, after seeing the man make a telephone call to the zoo before leaving, George decides to try the telephone himself, until he inadvertently calls the fire station and sets off a false fire alarm. The firefighters (who hear the call and the alarm) are unaware that it is George. Then they look at a signal screen (revealing a map) and the location highlights where the telephone call had come from. Thinking there is a real fire, the firefighters get into their trucks quickly. But when they rush to the house, all they find is no fire but a monkey (which is George). A thin firefighter caught one arm and the fat one caught the other. They arrest him for the false alarm. They tell George that since he fooled the fire department, they will have to shut him up in a prison where he cannot do anymore harm.

George wanted to get out so he climbed up to the window to try the bars. At that moment, a watchman comes in and climbs on a wooden bed to catch George. The watchman, however, is heavy that the bed tips over and pins him against the wall, thus stalling him. This buys George enough time to run out the open door. After escaping, he spots a balloon vendor out in the street and tries to grab a balloon but ends up grabbing the entire bunch and gets sent flying off into the air. Down below, the houses and people look like toy houses and dolls, respectively. George is carried by the breeze until it fades out, leaving George on top of a traffic signal, which mixes up traffic. The man with the yellow hat finds him there, buys all the balloons from the street vendor, and finally takes George to his new home at the zoo, where each animal gets its own balloon.

Reception

Sales and republication 
Five years after the book’s publication, Houghton Mifflin almost stopped printing the book due to its low demand, but it later became much more popular. Since its publishing, the book has never gone out of print and has sold over 25 million copies. The book has been published in paperback, hardcover, pop-up book, and audiobook.

Critical commentary 
Curious George has received many positive reviews from critics as well as a few negative ones. Critic David Mehegan of the Milwaukee Journal Sentinel argues that children should understand that Curious George’s curiosity does get him into a lot of trouble, such as when he floats away on the balloons, but his curiosity makes life more interesting. Ultimately, children relate to this character because he, like them, “impulsively breaks commonsense rules set by grown-ups in a desire to understand the marvelous new world around him.”

Critic Shannon Maughan of Publishers Weekly claims this book can be used by teachers to help promote conservation of forests and the species inside of them. The Reys have also published more books relating to conservation efforts and environmental awareness including Curious George Plants a Seed in 2007 and Curious George Plants a Tree in 2010.

In author Rivka Gachen's New Yorker piece, she found contradictory parallels in Curious George to the Middle Passage and the “reassuring and almost fantastical sense of wealth." Gachen claims the idea that a monkey being taken from Africa and almost drowning in the Atlantic Ocean can be very closely paralleled with the Middle Passage. On the other hand, the material goods that George receives once he arrives in America contradict these original ideas.

Accolades 
Curious George was a finalist for induction into the American Booksellers Association Indies Choice Book Awards Picture Book Hall of Fame in 2009, 2010, and 2011. In 2012, the book was officially inducted into the Hall.

Analysis 
Professor and children’s literature scholar June Cummins assesses Curious George from a postcolonial perspective, arguing that many elements of story parallel African slave-captivity narratives (such as George’s capture and journey across the Atlantic reflecting the horrors of the Middle Passage) and treat George as a colonial subject. In this way, Cummins concludes, the Curious George series portrays and excuses both imperialism and colonialism, and reflects the cultural ambivalence that many Americans display towards the nation’s history of slavery.

In her book tracing themes of racism, colonialism, and American exceptionalism in the Curious George series, author Rae Lynn Schwartz-DuPre also argues for a postcolonial reading of Curious George and contends that the series should be framed as a “classic example of colonial children’s literature." She discusses George as an agent of Americanization who is used to promote insidious notions of American exceptionalism, yet is protected from critique as a beloved and nostalgic cultural icon of childhood adventure and naiveté.

About the authors 

Main articles: Margret Rey and H. A. Rey

Margret Elizabeth Rey (May 16, 1906 – December 21, 1996) and her husband Hans Augusto "H.A." Rey (September 16, 1898 – August 26, 1977) met each other in Brazil and then moved to Paris. After moving several places to escape the Nazis, they settled down in New York.

It was here that they wrote Curious George and seven other books about him including Curious George Takes a Job, which won the Lewis Carroll Shelf Award in 1960. Having been raised in the cosmopolitan city of Hamburg (and its suburb Altona) and later spending time in England, Brazil, and France, the Rey's were both polyglots, with Margret achieving fluency in three languages and Hans in "no fewer than four." Professor Yulia Komska notes that, despite the authors' self-professed multilingual backgrounds, the Curious George series is monolingual and features a monkey who cannot speak.

The Reys moved to Cambridge, Massachusetts in 1963, in a house near Harvard Square, and lived there until Hans's death in 1977.
A children's bookstore named Curious George & Friends (formerly Curious George Goes to Wordsworth) was started in the 1990s by friends of the Reys, and operated in the Square until 2011. A new store opened in 2012 at the same address, called The World's Only Curious George Store - Harvard Square. In June 2019, this new store closed.

References

1941 children's books
American picture books
Curious George
Houghton Mifflin books